Heather and Ivan Morison are a Welsh artist duo known for their conceptual and performative public artworks.

The duo, Heather Peak (born 1973) and Ivan Morison (born 1974), are based in North Wales.

Work
In 2007 they grew and then distributed 10,000 flowers in Bloomberg's headquarters in London's financial district, as an expression of love incongruous with the cut-throat world of economic enterprise. Sleepers Awake, a work from 2011, was an attempt to reverse the order of nature by raising a second sun at night over the north Kent badlands.

Exhibitions
Exhibitions include the 2016's Royal Academy Summer Show, the Tate Britain, the Tate Modern, South London Gallery and the Vancouver Art Gallery.

They represented Wales at the 52nd Venice Biennial.

References

British artist groups and collectives